Ek Deewaana Tha (There Was A Lover) is an Indian Thriller, Romance television show which was broadcast on Sony Entertainment Television from 23 October 2017 to 1 June 2018. The show was created by Prateek Sharma and produced by LSD Films Private Limited.

The series starred Namik Paul,  Vikram Singh Chauhan and Donal Bisht.

Plot
In an accident, Shiv dies and Sharanya ends up in a coma. When she wakes up, she has no memory of the last few years and a man named Vyom Bedi claims to be her boyfriend. After strange incidents threaten Vyom's life (caused by Shiv's spirit), Sharanya takes advice from a sadhvi and reluctantly agrees to marry Vyom to save his life angering Shiv's spirit. As they get married, Vyom's father Rajan Bedi kills Sharanya's father. Shiv's spirit attacks and injures Vyom and Sharanya goes to Kapali Hills to find out how she can protect Vyom. There she discovers Shiv's dead body and recalls her past - how Vyom was obsessed with her and that Shiv was her actual boyfriend. Vyom had killed Shiv to marry Sharanya.

Sharanya begins collecting evidence against Vyom with help from Shiv's spirit. Meanwhile, Vyom kills the sadhvi and Vidyut who had discovered his lies. When Sharanya tries to prove Vyom's crimes, his mother Madhvi takes the blame instead and is arrested. Vyom's father Rajan wants his wife released so Vyom and he fake his death and put the blame on him thus procuring Madhvi's release.

Vyom blackmails Odhni to help him get rid of Shiv's spirit and, on her advice, manipulates Shiv's mother Suvarna to get Sharanya to perform Shiv's last rites and burn all his belongings. He then asks Detective Freddy to kill Odhni as well but Sharanya sees Rajan and Madhvi together and confronts Vyom. Vyom is forced to admit his crimes - the murders of Shiv's father (to protect his own parents), Shiv, the sadhvi and Sharanya's father (who found out Shiv was Sharanya's lover) and Sharanya's doctor.

Sharanya tells him that she could never love him and prepares to leave but he holds Suvarna at knifepoint and threatens Sharanya to give him Shiv's ring so he can get rid of Shiv's spirit for good. But before she can remove it, Suvarna pushes her off a cliff to her death to help her escape from Vyom's hell and reunite with Shiv in spirit.

About to kill Suvarna, a distraught Vyom instead kills himself.

25 years later
Rajan and Madhvi are raising a girl named Shivani who returns from London with her boyfriend Akash who is Vyom's lookalike and whose mannerisms also remind Rajan of Vyom.

Shivani and Akash decide to get engaged and at their engagement party, Akash surprises her with her favourite superstar Krrish Khanna (KK) who is Shiv's lookalike. Then they meet Radhika at their film shooting who is Sharanya's lookalike.

Suvarna reveals that Radhika is Sharanya's reincarnation and that Odhni and Suvarna swapped the babies because Rajan and Madhvi wanted to adopt the girl expected to be Sharanya's reincarnation. Rajan and Madhvi imprison Suvarna in the basement.

Krish and Radhika see Suvarna and try to help her. Meanwhile, at Akash and Shivani's wedding, Akash is revealed to be Vyom. Suvarna had prevented him from killing himself declaring it his punishment to stay alive. Having discovered Akash's true identity as Vyom and his story, Shivani is then killed by Freddy and Vyom.

Akash pretends that Shivani has gone missing and Radhika must take her place in the film. Krish convinces Radhika to join the film as they continue searching for Shivani. Radhika hears Shivani's phone ringing in the basement and goes there to find her but is confronted by Freddy and faints on seeing him. She awakens in her bed and is told by Akash that she was imagining things and that they are in Manali to look for Shivani. However, Radhika shows Krish Freddy's shirt button to prove to him that she did see him in the basement.

Radhika and Krish go to the basement to find Shivani but are overpowered by Freddy and Vyom. Radhika pretends to recall her past life and says that she remembers being in love with Vyom. Krish is shocked but Vyom is overjoyed to finally get Sharanya till he realises she is lying to find Suvarna, Rajan and Madhvi. Vyom attacks Krish and tries to forcibly marry Radhika but Krish tricks him into killing Freddy. Krish and Radhika then marry before Vyom's eyes who commits suicide by jumping off a cliff.

Krish and Radhika are finally eternally united, destined to be together from the very beginning for every life and afterlife,  however it is not without obstacles; they still must face a challenge as the forces of good are always in constant battle with the forces of evil, and so they do by facing off Vyom's malignant spirit that's determined to pester them unseen.

Cast

Main
 Namik Paul as Shiv Kapoor: Sharanya's boyfriend, Suvarna's son
Krish Khanna: Radhika's husband
 Vikram Singh Chauhan as Vyom Bedi: Sharanya's husband, Rajan and Madhvi's son
 Aakash Khurana: Shivani's boyfriend
 Donal Bisht as Sharanya Bisht: Shiv's girlfriend, Vyom's wife
Radhika: Krish's wife

Recurring
Amar Upadhyay as Rajan Bedi: Madhvi's husband, Vyom's father, Shivani's adoptive father
 Jaswinder Gardner as Madhvi Bedi: Rajan's wife, Vyom's mother, Shivani's adoptive mother 
 Shivani Surve as Shivani Bedi: Aakash's girlfriend, Rajan and Madhvi's adoptive daughter
Payal Nair as Suvarna Kapoor: Shiv's mother
Delnaaz Irani as Odhni
Jason Tham as Detective Freddy D’Mello: Vyom's accomplice
Shilpa Tulaskar as Sadhvi
Sachin Parikh as Rameshwar "Ram" Bisht: Sharanya's father
Mamta Verma as Suman Bisht: Sharanya's mother
 Gaurav Sareen as Aditya Bisht: Sharanya's brother
 Ajay Nain as Vidyut Bedi
 Raymon Kakar as Chandni Bedi
 Geeta Bisht as Rati Bedi
 Ayaan Khan as Rab Bedi

References

External links
 Ek Deewaana Tha on Sony LIV
 

Hindi-language television shows
2017 Indian television series debuts
Indian romance television series
Indian thriller television series
Indian fantasy television series
Indian mystery television series
Indian horror fiction television series
Indian drama television series
Television shows set in Uttarakhand
Sony Entertainment Television original programming
2018 Indian television series endings
Ghosts in television